Icelandic Movement – Living Country was a green political party in Iceland founded by the reporter and environmentalist Ómar Ragnarsson and Sigurlín Margrét Sigurðardóttir in 2007 to contest the 2007 parliamentary election. It failed to clear the election threshold and did not enter the Alþingi due to a new electoral law which raised the threshold to 5%; the party would have gotten three seats according to the old electoral law. At the Social Democratic Alliance's party congress in late March 2009, the Icelandic Movement became part of the SDA.

Election results

References

Defunct political parties in Iceland
Environmentalism in Iceland
Political parties established in 2007
Political parties disestablished in 2009
2007 establishments in Iceland
2009 disestablishments in Iceland
Green parties in Europe